Chilii may refer to several villages in Romania:

 Chilii, a village in Mioarele Commune, Argeș County
 Chilii, a village in Valea Ursului Commune, Neamţ County
 Chilii, a village in Dobrun Commune, Olt County